Women's Weapons is a lost 1918 American silent comedy-drama film directed by Robert G. Vignola and starring Ethel Clayton.

Cast
Ethel Clayton as Anne Elliot
Elliott Dexter as Nicholas Elliot
Vera Doria as Esmee Hale
James Neill as Peter Gregory
Josephine Crowell as Margaret
Pat Moore as Nicholas, Jr.
Joan Marsh as Nicholas, Jr.'s sister (credited as Dorothy Rosher)

References

External links

1918 films
American silent feature films
Lost American films
Films directed by Robert G. Vignola
1918 comedy-drama films
1910s English-language films
American black-and-white films
1918 lost films
Lost comedy-drama films
1910s American films
Silent American comedy-drama films